Čedomir Lazarević (5 October 1926 – 20 October 1962) was a Serbian footballer who played for FK Partizan.

Death
He died in a car crash on 20 October 1962 at the 25th kilometre of the Belgrade–Zagreb highway. Also killed with him were his Partizan team-mate Bruno Belin, Radnički player Vladimir Josipović and Yugoslav national swimming team member Boris Škanata.

Legacy
The FK Partizan Academy is named in his honour.

Honours
Partizan
 Yugoslav First League: 1948–49
 Yugoslav Cup: 1952, 1954, 1957

References

1926 births
1962 deaths
Footballers from Belgrade
Serbian footballers
Yugoslav footballers
Association football defenders
Yugoslav First League players
FK Partizan players
Road incident deaths in Yugoslavia
Road incident deaths in Serbia